Ingrid Klimke (born 1 April 1968 in Münster, West Germany) is a German eventing rider. She appeared at five Olympics from 2000 to 2016. With her horse Abraxxas, she won two gold medals in team eventing at the 2008 Summer Olympics and the 2012 Summer Olympics. At the 2016 Summer Olympics, she won a team silver with Hale-Bob.

She is the daughter of equestrian Reiner Klimke. Like her father, she rides in both eventing and dressage at international events, for example, she was placed seventh at the 2002 Dressage World Cup Final with Nector van het Carelshof. In 2022, she made her debut on the German dressage team at the World Championships, where she was awarded a team bronze medal.

In January 2012 she was appointed to the position of "Reitmeister" (Riding Master, a special title of the German Equestrian Federation).  Klimke is the second woman ever to be appointed as "Reitmeister".

Youth
Through her father, Klimke started to work with horses at a very young age.

She states that she never thought about a career in equestrianism. Since her youth she has been competing in dressage, show jumping and eventing. Her trainers were, besides her father, Fritz Ligges and Ian Millar. About her trainers she says:

I received a consistent training from all of them, which was geared to develop an intensive bonding between horse and rider and to never overburden the horses. Being Ian Millar’s working student I learned everything about care and show jumping and I am really grateful towards my father for making that stay abroad possible.

After her school days, she began an apprenticeship as a bank clerk and afterwards she began to study to become a teacher. Later she realized that it was not possible to this and keep riding at the same time so she decided to dedicate herself to equestrianism and horse training.

CCI5* Results

International Championship Results

Notable Horses 

 Sleep Late - 1991 Gray British Sport Horse Gelding (Kuwait Beach XX x Evening Trial)
 1999 European Championships - Individual 39th Place
 2000 Sydney Olympics - Team Fourth Place
 2004 Athens Olympics - Team Fourth Place
 2005 European Championships - Individual Bronze Medal
 2006 World Equestrian Games - Team Gold Medal
 Nector vh Carelshof - 1990 Bay Gelding
 2002 FEI Dressage World Cup Final - Seventh Place
 FRH Butts Abraxxas - 1997 Gray Hanoverian Gelding (Heraldik XX x Kronenkranich XX)
 2007 European Championships - Team Seventh Place, Individual Tenth Place
 2008 Beijing Olympics - Team Gold Medal, Individual Fifth Place
 2009 European Championships - Team Eighth Place
 2010 World Equestrian Games - Team Fifth Place, Individual 13th Place
 2011 European Championships - Team Gold Medal, Individual 11th Place
 2012 London Olympics - Team Gold Medal, Individual 25th Place
 SAP Escada FRH - 2004 Bay Hanoverian Mare (Embassy I x Lehnsherr)
 2013 European Championships - Team Gold Medal, Individual Silver Medal
 2014 World Equestrian Games - Team Gold Medal, Individual 13th Place
 2015 Luhmuhlen CCI**** Winner
 SAP Hale Bob OLD - 2004 Bay Oldenburg Gelding (Helikon XX x Noble Champion)
 2014 Pau CCI**** Winner
 2015 European Championships - Team Gold Medal, Individual Fifth Place
 2016 Rio Olympics - Team Silver Medal, Individual 14th Place
 2017 European Championships - Team Tenth Place, Individual Gold Medal
 Weisse Duene - 2009 Gray Holsteiner Mare (Clarimo x Romino)
 2016 FEI Eventing Young Horse World Championships - Gold Medal

References

External links 

 
 
 
 
 Human to Hero: Olympics a family affair for champion Klimke, CNN portrait of Ingrid Klimke with a video portrait

German event riders
Olympic gold medalists for Germany
Olympic silver medalists for Germany
Equestrians at the 2000 Summer Olympics
Equestrians at the 2004 Summer Olympics
Equestrians at the 2008 Summer Olympics
Equestrians at the 2012 Summer Olympics
Equestrians at the 2016 Summer Olympics
Olympic equestrians of Germany
German female equestrians
Living people
1968 births
Olympic medalists in equestrian
Medalists at the 2016 Summer Olympics
Medalists at the 2012 Summer Olympics
Medalists at the 2008 Summer Olympics
Sportspeople from Münster
20th-century German women
21st-century German women